Ruston is a small village in the Scarborough district of North Yorkshire, England, forming part of the civil parish of Wykeham.

Villages in North Yorkshire